April 25 Sports Club (Sa i o ch'eyuktan), or 4.25 SC for short, or sometimes April 25 National Defence Sports Club (4.25'국방체육단', Sa i o ch'eyuktan "Kukpang ch'eyuktan"), is a multi-sports club based in P'yŏngyang, North Korea, primarily known outside of North Korea for its men's and women's football teams. The club belongs to the Ministry of People's Armed Forces; all members of the professional teams (male and female) are considered officers of the Army.

History
The club was established in March 1947 or July 1949 as the Central Sports Training School Sports Club (중앙체육강습소체육단, Chung'ang ch'eyukkangsŭpso ch'eyukdan).

On 25 June 1971 or 26 June 1972, the club name was changed to its current name; Kim Il-sung's anti-Japanese guerilla army – Joseon People's Revolutionary Army, considered the predecessor of the Korean People's Army, was formed on 25 April 1932. (Until 1977, the original KPA's official date of establishment was 8 February 1948. However, in 1978, it was changed to 25 April 1932.This change was reverted in 2018.)
 
The men's football team plays in the DPR Korea Premier Football League, and is the most successful club side in the country, having won 22 national championships. April 25's home stadium is the Yanggakdo Stadium. In international club competition, home matches are usually played at the Kim Il-sung Stadium. In 2015, April 25 achieved an uncommon feat, with both the men's and women's clubs winning their respective national championships.

Confusion with February 8 Sports Club
February 8 Sports Club and April 25 Sports Club have many similarities, but the North Korean Ministry of People's Armed Forces operates both sports clubs separately. The 2017 editions of the Paektusan Prize and the Mangyongdae Prize were won by April 25 Sports Club, with February 8 Sports Club finishing in second place.

Rivalries
April 25's primary rival is Amnokgang. Amnokgang belongs to the Ministry of People's Security, and the professional rivalry between the Military and the Police carries over onto the sports field. There is also a strong rivalry with Pyongyang, known as "the Pyongyang Derby".

Current squad

Continental history

Honours

Domestic
DPR Korea Premier Football League
 Winners (19): 1985, 1986, 1987, 1988, 1990, 1992, 1993, 1994, 1995, 2002, 2003, 2010, 2011, 2012, 2013, 2015, 2017, 2017–18, 2018–19, 2021–22
 Runners-up (2): 2014, 2016
Hwaebul Cup
 Winners (4): 2013, 2014, 2015, 2016
Man'gyŏngdae Prize
 Winners (7): 2002, 2009, 2012, 2014, 2015, 2016, 2017
Paektusan Prize
 Winners (1): 2017
Poch'ŏnbo Torch Prize
 Winners (3): 2005, 2011, 2014
DPR Korea Championship
 Winners (3): 2001, 2006, 2011

Continental 
 AFC Cup
 Runners-up (1): 2019
 Asian Club Championship
 Fourth place (1): 1990–91

Invitational
DCM Trophy
 Winners (1): 1972

Women's football

April 25's women's football team is one of the strongest women's football teams in North Korea; they have become national champions at least six times, in 2002, 2009, 2010, 2011, 2013, and 2015.

Other sports
In addition to football, April 25 participates in dozens of different sports, including athletics, ice hockey, basketball, volleyball, and handball.

Basketball
April 25 has fielded a basketball team. In May 2015, they came to Mongolia to assist in training the Mongolian national team as preparation of the latter's campaign at the 2013 East Asian Basketball Championship.

Ice hockey
April 25's ice hockey team won the national championship in 1989.

Volleyball
April 25 has both women's and men's volleyball teams. April 25 participated at the 2015 VTV International Women's Volleyball Cup, an invitational tournament in Vietnam. The North Korean club won the bronze medal defeating Vietnamese side, VTV Bình Điền Long An. Their player, Jong Jin Sim was named Most Valuable Player of the tournament.

Achievements
VTV Bình Điền Cup: 1
 Champions: 2015

VTV International Women's Volleyball Cup: 2
 Champions: 2008
 Third place: 2015

See also 
 February 8 Sports Club

References

External links

Association football clubs established in 1947
Association football clubs established in 1949
 
Football clubs in North Korea
Multi-sport clubs in North Korea
Football clubs in Pyongyang
1949 establishments in North Korea
Military association football clubs in North Korea
Military of North Korea